Ján Takáč (2 February 1909 – 18 January 1995) was a Slovak long-distance runner. He competed in the marathon at the 1936 Summer Olympics.

References

External links
 

1909 births
1995 deaths
Athletes (track and field) at the 1936 Summer Olympics
Slovak male long-distance runners
Slovak male marathon runners
Olympic athletes of Czechoslovakia
People from Sobrance District
Sportspeople from the Košice Region